The Huntress Diana Fountain (Fuente de la Diana Cazadora) is a monumental fountain of Diana located in the roundabout at Paseo de la Reforma and Río Misisipí and Sevilla streets, on the border of the Colonia Cuauhtémoc and Colonia Juárez neighborhoods of Mexico City.  Nearby landmarks named after the fountain include the Cine Diana and the skyscrapers Corporativo Reforma Diana (a.k.a. Torre Reforma Diana) and Torre Diana.

History

Between the 1930s and 1960s, the capital authorities carried out different beautification projects of the capital, Mexican that would involve the placement of various monuments and monumental fountains in the public space in tune with the mural movement and with the aesthetic influence of socialist realism.

The then president of Mexico Manuel Ávila Camacho, through the regent of the Federal District, Javier Rojo Gómez commissioned the duo formed by the architect Vicente Mendiola and the sculptor Juan Olaguíbel that would jointly carry out other similar projects as the source of the Plaza California in Colonia del Valle and the Oil Fountain the construction of a fountain for the roundabout that was located in Paseo de la Reforma 
near the entrance to the Chapultepec Forest. The topic chosen by the commission agents was Diana's the Roman goddess of the hunt. Artemis in Greek mythology, but in this source, that goddess instead of hunting animals would now arrow the stars of the northern skies. The elaboration of The Arrow of the Northern Stars, which has an approximate weight of two tons. It happened between April and September 1942 a workshop of the World Workers Street.

References

External links

 
"Diana Fountain", Mexico City Guide

1942 sculptures
Cuauhtémoc, Mexico City
Diana (mythology)
Fountains in Mexico
Hunting in art
Monuments and memorials in Mexico City
Nude sculptures
Outdoor sculptures in Mexico City
Paseo de la Reforma
Sculptures of Artemis